Ibicella is a genus of plants in the Martyniaceae family.

Species include:
Ibicella lutea (Lindl.) Van Eselt.
Ibicella nelsoniana (Barb. Rodr.) Van Eselt.
Ibicella parodii Abbiatti

References

Martyniaceae
Lamiales genera
Carnivorous plants of North America
Carnivorous plants of South America